During the 1948–49 season Hibernian, a football club based in Edinburgh, came third out of 16 clubs in the Scottish First Division.

Scottish First Division

Final League table

Scottish League Cup

Group stage

Group 1 final table

Scottish Cup

See also
List of Hibernian F.C. seasons

References

External links
Hibernian 1948/1949 results and fixtures, Soccerbase

Hibernian F.C. seasons
Hibernian